A chokha also known as a cherkeska is a woolen coat with a high neck that is part of the traditional male dress of peoples of the Caucasus. It was in wide use among Avars, Abazins, Abkhazians, Eastern Armenians, Azerbaijanis, Balkars, Chechens, Circassians, Georgians, Ingush, Karachays, Nogais, Ossetians, Tats, the peoples of Dagestan, as well as Terek and Kuban Cossacks who adopted it from the aforementioned peoples.

Etymology 
Russians and Ukrainians called the attire a cherkeska (meaning 'of/from Circassia') because when they arrived in the Caucasus they saw it for the first time being worn by Circassians. Later the Kuban Cossacks adopted it as part of their costume.

Before the Russian invasion, parts of the South Caucasus were under a Persian influence so the word chugha was widely used in the region and still continues to be used to refer to the attire, although, the pronunciation of the word varies among ethnicities. The word chugha is of an Iranian origin meaning 'outfit made of textile', but it was also found being used in Turkic languages to describe another similar coat chugha (çoğa) that was worn during winters in Central Asia. In that context, it is also possible that the word comes from the word chek, which is what the Turks call cotton fabric, from which the outerwear is sewn. Also, the word chek means "pull", "tighten", "tie up". From the Book of Dede Korkut, the name of this type of clothing was known among the Oghuz Turks as "chuga" or "cuha" as well which translates to "cloth".. 

The word chugha was used mostly in regions like the South Caucasus, Chechnya and Dagestan. Georgians call it chokha but the clothing used to be called talavari which is now known as the Khevsur chokha. Azerbaijanis either call the caftan a chukha or chuxa or arkhalig, although arkhalig is most of the time associated with a lighter jacket but Azerbaijanis use those words interchangeably.

However, in Circassian languages, the word chugha was not adopted and the outfit is known as shwakh-tsia which means 'covers the horseman', or simply tsey, meaning 'from fabric'. The Turkic groups in North Caucasus such as the Nogais, Balkars, Karachays and Kumyks named the coat chepken, which is another word that entered the Russian language in the form of chekmen.

History and development

A popular theory is that the caftan found in Moschevaya Balka is the prototype of what we know today as chokha. The prototype may have been a common type of clothing among the Khazars and the Alans. It is possible that the caftan has its origins from the Generic Horse Archer Costume which is a clothing style worn by horsemen among the Iranic groups, Western Turks, the Huns, and also the east Germanic peoples who settled in the Pontic and Danube regions and took the clothes west after the invasion of the Huns in 375 CE. The caftan was worn by horsemen along the Silk Road in Caucasus during the 8th to 10th centuries, although, the generic horse archer costume remained unchanged in the region for centuries. Due to tensions between Byzantine Empire and Persia, Georgia became an important route for steppe merchants to deliver silk to Byzantium. Georgians and other North Caucasian groups started adopting the costume style because of Georgia's role in the silk road and having constant interactions with the neighboring steppe peoples.  

The costume consisted of the following elements: shorts, leggings, caftan or coat (multiple layers), and boots. The large dolman sleeves allow for freedom of movement and the two slits towards the back allow the skirt to cover the legs more fully while seated on horseback. The original use of the coat is very specialized for mounted archery, horse riding, and combat, similar to the use modern chokha. Well-preserved caftans were made of Sogdian and Chinese fabrics. Later in the Khazar reign the caftan started to become associated with aristocracy in the Caucasus and it remained that way until late 19th century. By the period of the Western Han dynasty (206 BCE–8 CE), silk trimming became a regular feature in the steppe environment. Prior to this, garments were trimmed with woven trim or fur. Piping or trimming of the caftan's collar and the chest was a common feature among the noble and common classes of the Parthians, Kushans, Sasanians, Sogdians, Hephthalites, Huns, Turks, Alans, and the Scythians. Another design of the caftan also includes the lapels. Lapels do not feature on Parthian, Kushan, or Sasanian caftans, however they do appear in art from Hepthalite and Sogdian sites, it is suggested that the political ascendance of the Western Turks in the Alan’s territory resulted in the adoption of lapels. The caftan prevailed in fashion through the early medieval period in the Near East and Central Asia.

There is very little evidence for the existence of a separate women’s clothing across the Eurasian steppe and in the Caucasus since the Moschevaya Balka graves show distinct sexual dimorphism in the clothes. Sogdian and Hunnic Women wore clothing comparatively more similar to their male counterparts. The differences in fashion between men and women start to become more obvious in later centuries, the male attire continues to follow Persian and Central Asian traditions while the female attire seems to have taken some of its inspiration from eastern Mediterranean models but the steppe influence remains. 

The 8th century caftan known as chokha evidently does not resemble the military outfit worn in Caucasus and among Cossacks that we know today, it transformed over time - it changed its length and added new elements. For example, earlier on there was no such detail on the chokha like the gazyr. It appeared later when firearms started to be widely used. Initially, gazyrs were carried in leather bags attached to a shoulder strap or belt but a lot of different objects were already attached to the belt, a shashka and a gun were worn over the shoulder on belts. This is why the gazyrs began to be sewn on the coat on both sides of the chest. This detail helped soldiers to easily store cartridges. In addition, the location it was sewn made it comfortable for the soldier wearing it so during the battle they did not have to look for them and fiddle around for a long time. Some chokhas had removable gazyrs while others were sown on the chest of the coat. More primitive versions of chokha looked like a looser, sometimes even a baggier type of clothing. The length was up to the knees or up to half of the thigh. Long narrow sleeves sometimes had a triangular protrusion at the bottom, covering the back of the arm. The chest was not as open as in chokhas from later models, and often there was a fastener from the neck to the waist. In some cases, there was a collar in the form of a low stand with bevelled front corners. Another difference between the prototype and the current chokha is the open cut chest of the coat which was most likely a style brought to Near East as a result of numerous Turkic invasions. The Caucasians also adopted numerous headwear and clothing items from the Iranian groups and later from the Turks that started to be worn together with the chokha . By the 18th century, a male costume common for the Caucasus was finally formed which consisted of gazyrs on the chest, beshmet, cherkeska, burka, bashlyk, papakha, etc.

Revival 

The chokha was in wide use among the inhabitants of the Caucasus from 8th until the early 20th century, when it declined during the Soviet Era. Nowadays, chokha is no longer in use but continues to still be worn for ceremonial and festive occasions. For many, it is a symbol of fight for freedom. In Georgia it is used as a symbol of national pride, and is frequently worn by Georgian men at weddings and official functions. Former Georgian President Mikheil Saakashvili ordered high-ranking Georgian officials working abroad to present themselves in national costumes, including the chokha, at official meetings. On June 9, 2020, the National Agency for Cultural Heritage Preservation in Georgia recognized Chokha wearing tradition as a part of Intangible cultural heritage of Georgia.

Types
Chokha types and designs vary by region and by culture but there are two types of chokhas worn most commonly in Caucasus: general and weighted. The common features are that the collars of both chokhas are cut open and the skirt of the coats are usually either corrugated or pleated. Chokha is usually made of broadcloth or shawl but some chokhas are made of thinner textiles for festive occasions. It was also common for chokhas to be worn without the bullet pockets or gazyrs. An arkhalig would also be worn under chokha. The style, decorations and patterns on chokha varies among ethnicities. 

There were also chukha types that included Persian elements such as the folding sleeves, completely unsewn from the armpit to the elbow, and sleeves that are cut in half from top which were worn for casual use. Those persianate style chukhas were predominantly worn among the inhabitants of Transcaucasia, especially among Azerbaijanis, Eastern Armenians, inhabitants of southern Dagestan, as well as among the Persians. In some artworks, Georgians are also depicted wearing it. The chukhas with the folding sleeves were the main uniform and clothing attire in the army of the Caucasian khanates. Later, it was in wide use in the Caucasian Convoy of the Imperial army and became a uniform of the chief officers of Muslim(Azerbaijani) and Lezgin Squadron. Along with the coat, a tall Qajar era fur hat was worn.

General type 
This is the most widely used type of chokha in the Caucasus. From the colors, the length and the general design of the chokha, it was possible to know a person's age, profession, and even class. The general cherkeska were sewn not only from gray and black fabric, but also from red, blue, green, golden yellow, purple and brown. The lining of the sleeve of the general chokha is made of silk fabric, the sleeves often have loops and buttons made of string. Chokhas with very long skirts were popular among the nobility. It is cut at the waist with gathers and folds, girded with a black leather belt decorated with silver pieces, the belt buckle served as a chair for carving fire. The outfit was a clothing for combat, it was not supposed to hinder movement, so the sleeves were wide and short, sometimes with rows of buttons down the openings, and hand flaps. Only the old people wore the sleeves long to warm the hands. As mentioned previously, later on cases were added to place cartridges, the cases made it possible to load a flint or match gun at full gallop. Sometimes the cases were located almost under the armpits. An obligatory item of both men's and women's clothing was long tight pants - an element of clothing that was present among the steppe peoples, which was necessary for frequent horseback riding and in harsh climatic conditions. The general outfit almost always includes a dagger called khinjal, a beshmet worn under the chokha, gazyrs (bullet/charge holders), and a bashlyk (a hood, separate from the robe) or a papakha (a tall fur hat).

Weighted type 
Unlike the general chokha, which was typically worn for battle, the main attribute of the weighted chokha is its small bullet-pockets or cartridge holders on both sides of the chest, which over time turned into having a purely decorative significance. Gazyrs for this chokha were made of wood, and in the upper, above-pocket part they had small hoods out of gold or silver with niello or gilt. Sometimes there were golden or silver chains going up front the gazyrs where they were connected with a rosette. It was customary for the weighted chokha to have a set of eight cartridge holders on each breast.

Georgians 

Among Georgians, three types of chokhas are primarily used: the Kartl-Kakheti chokha (Kartli and Kakheti are eastern Georgian provinces), the Khevsur chokha (mainly in the Mtskheta-Mtianeti province of Georgia), and the Adjarian chokha (mainly found in western Georgian provinces such as Adjara and Guria, previously also in Lazona). In Georgia, the color black for chokha was reserved to the "Orden of Chokhosani" who represented the elite society of the citizens: great generals, war heroes, famous poets, and the people who had done some big service to the country. Special decorations were also used to denote their status.

Kartli-Kakheti chokha 
The Kartli-Kakheti version shares similarities with the general Caucasian chokha. In most cases, different decorations fill the bullet spaces. The Kartli-Kakheti chokha is longer than the Khevsur chokha and has triangle-like shapes on the chest, exposing the inner cloth called beshmet. It tends to have  (locally called masri) on both sides of the chest-spaces. The skirt usually has slits on the sides. People wear them without belts. The Kartli-Kakheti chokha has long sleeves and is usually black, dark red or blue.

This is the most popular chokha used in Georgia, often seen in official meeting and musical performance.

Khevsurian chokha 
The Khevsur chokha was worn in the Khevsureti province of Georgia in the Greater Caucasus mountains. The Khevsur chokha is considered to be the closest to the medieval version of the chokha as it shares similarities in design with the aforementioned caftan found in Moschevaya Balka. It is mostly short, with trapezoid shapes. The front side of the chokha has rich decorations and slits on the sides, which extend to the waist. The Khevsur chokha has rich decorations made up of crosses and icons.

Adjarian chokha 

The Adjarian chokha is worn in Adjara, Guria regions of Georgia and was worn in historical Lazeti(modern day Turkey), though, the outfit is more similar to the clothing worn by Pontic Greeks. Adjaran national men's costume consists of a shirt (perangi) and trousers cut out in a specific way (dzigva) and sewn from wool fabric or sateen of black colour. Because trousers are folded, wide on top and narrowed down, they were comfortable and were easy to wear in action. The outer garment was zubuni that was tucked into the trousers. Zubunis were winter clothing, warmed with cotton lining and sleeveless vests. The most expensive and visible part is chokha which was tied around with special broad belt with laces or leather belt. Kabalakhi (or bashlyk) is a winter headwear made of thin wool. And, of course, outfit would not be complete without a dagger in sheath, a rifle and bandolier or gazyr. As footwear they used colorful wool knitted socks, pachula (soft leather shoes) and boots tied with belts.

North Caucasians 
Evgenia Nikolaevna Studenetskaya, a well-known scholar and museum figure who worked for more than 50 years at the State Museum of Ethnography (now the Russian Museum of Ethnography), was one of the best experts on the customs of the peoples of the Caucasus, as well as the costume of the peoples of the North Caucasus. In 1989, she published the book "Clothes of the peoples of the North Caucasus of the XVIII-XX centuries". Generally, the North Caucasian groups wore a very similar style of the general cherkeska. The only way one could tell to which group the coat belonged to is by inspecting the textile it was made of, the decorations, and the number bullet cases sown on the cherkeska.

According to her book, in Circassian and Abkhazian societies the cherkeska was worn among the royals, the knights, and of upper class. Different colors of clothing for males were strictly used to distinguish between different social classes, for example white is usually worn by princes, red by nobles, gray, brown, and black by peasants (blue, green and the other colors were rarely worn). Until 1785, Circassia resembled the medieval states of Western Europe due to their feudal systems, however, the spread of Islam in those territories started to diminish the system. Because of the feudalist nature of the their society Circassian knightly culture was developed. They made up the troops of the Circassian principalities, almost identical in structure, form, and in other parameters to the European concept of "knightly army". The cherkeska was in wide use among the Circassian cavalry and was worn together with weaponry and armor. It was also common among inhabitants of Northwestern Caucasus to wear cherkeskas with no open cut on the chest. The number of pockets or cases for gazyrs can vary from 4-5 up to 18 on each side of the chest. The numbers of gazyrs is special as its also an indicator of status and ranking among the Circassians especially among the noble warriors. 

Weapons that are frequently worn with the Circassian attire is a dagger called  kama or kinzhal (when transliterating ) and a sword called shashka. It is a special kind of sabre; a very sharp, single-edged, single-handed, and guardless sword. Although the sword is used by most of Russian and Ukrainian Cossacks, the typically Adyghean form of the sabre is longer than the Cossack type.

The cherkeskas Ossetians wore had a slightly different characteristics. In art, Ossetians are depicted in a short cherkeska without a cutout on the chest, its sides are pulled together by three pairs of strings. Ossetians also have other caftans of similar design to the general cherkeska such karts, a winter sheepskin coat, and a lighter unlined linen caftan with frogging called the kurta, both are words of Iranian origin. Ossetians and Circassians generally wore their coats in similar fashion. The coats were most of the time made of black or gray cloth, with split sleeves. Sometimes the sleeves have a slit on the inside from the armpit and below the elbow, coats with sleeves shortened to the elbow were also commonly used. Ossetians wore gazyrs cases made from leather which held cartridges from 7 to 10 compartments. 

Materials among the Nakh peoples are poorer. There are various depictions by travellers of Ingush men in a cherkeska with a standing collar, the coat resembles the type worn among the Northwestern Caucasians. In the album published in Paris in 1813, Chechens are depicted in short, knee-length coats with narrow sleeves. Alexander Beggrov depicts a Chechen in a short fur coat with a separate gas cap hanging on a belt. In D.A. Milyutin's works, a Chechen is depicted in a short, but wide-open coat with a narrow sleeves.

Azerbaijanis 

Azerbaijanis wore chukha with or without the gazyrs. The chukha with sewn bullet pockets was called "hazyrdashly", it was called "hazyrdashsyz" if it was without the sewn bullet pockets. The caftan and the bullet cases are decorated with various golden or silver laces and other fabrics, specific decorations and patterns are usually added on their costumes that makes it differ from the other styles. The color of the chukha mattered to Azerbaijanis as well. The colors that were used most often were blue, green, white, brown, and black. The colors white and blue were used for the inside of the coat and as a layer indicator. In Azerbaijani society, chukha was worn among the peasants as well as the upper class, while in other parts of the Caucasus it was worn to attribute to upper class and the aristocracy as a remnant of Khazar traditions, it had more of a symbol of boasting than practicality. Different materials and decorations were used on chukhas and arkhaligs to determine social class and age. Some chukas were not worn for battles and did not have gazyrs, Azerbaijanis wore those for performing their folk music such as mugham. Azerbaijani men usually wore the chukha and the arkhalig in the same fashion Turkmens, Volga Tatars and the Crimean Tatars wore their caftans. Aside from the general and weighted chukha, there are other types that were in wide use among Azerbaijanis such as the "duzyakha", "oymayakha", and "atmagol" chukhas.

One of the most popular types of chukhas used among Azerbaijanis was the atmagol chukha, which is a Persian styled chukha worn for battles.  The arms of atmagol were long and the entirety of the sleeves were cut and completely detached. The long sleeves could be hung behind the shoulder. Aside from the aesthetic, the sleeves were used to deceive the enemy during battle and also to keep the hands warm. The atmagol chukha is considered to be a huge national pride of the Azerbaijani people and is an important part of the male traditional attire along with the arkhalig.
Duzyakha and oymayakha differed from general chukha when it came to the shape of the arm. The lining of the arm with a swollen or rounded tip was made of silk. These sleeves often had loops and buttons made of string. Oymayakha was similar to duzyakha as neither required bullet pockets, however, the two types differed in the design of the collar: duzyakha translates to "plain collar" while oymayakha means "carved collar". Oymayakha was popular in Nakhchivan, the collar of the coat was heavily decorated, the design reflected the fashion of the Qajar era. 
Other types of chukhas worn by Azerbaijanis that were recorded are: “kemerchin”, “buzmely”, “takhtaly”, “qolchaqly”, “doshuachig”, and “doqquztakhta”.

Cossacks 

Cherkeska was constantly worn by Terek and Kuban Cossacks and the dress code was identical to the one worn by Caucasians. The main color worn in the army was in black, gray, dark blue, white, and brown; red was only worn for important ceremonies. Although the color of the daily cherkeska was up to the individual's choice, by the time of the Great War each Cossack had to wear a gray cherkeska and black beshmet as a uniform. Some cossacks variated their cherkeskas and beshmets with different kinds of halons and cartridges, sewed initials or namesakes and decorated it with various laces, but that was considered unprofessional. 

The length of the coat was regulated in the army but was not strongly enforced until later. Before the war of 1914-1918, its length decreased significantly and reached almost a knee. This was partly due to the convenience of movement and landing on a horse, and partly for the sake of aesthetics. But the concept of aesthetics is conditional and in the late XIX century the cherkeska was worn long, reaching many almost heels. On the cutout and at the bottom it is sheathed with a shoelace, black or in the color of the material from which it is sewn. It is fastened on internal hooks or loops tied from the lace with which it is sheathed. Cossacks called such fasteners "gudzyki". In winter, some Cossacks wore cherkeskas with fur called "Bekirks" or "kurks".

References 

"Kitabi-Dada Gorgud Encyclopedia", II volume. Baku, 2004.

External links
 საქართველოს კულტურული მემკვიდრეობის დაცვის ეროვნული სააგენტოს ოფიციალური ვებგვერდი
 საქართველოს არამატერიალური კულტურული მემკვიდრეობის ძეგლების სია
 :ru:%D0%A7%D0%B5%D1%80%D0%BA%D0%B5%D1%81%D0%BA%D0%B0

9th-century fashion
Culture of the Caucasus
Clothing of Georgia (country)
Persian words and phrases
Khazars
Alans
Circassians
Cossack culture
Military uniforms
Azerbaijani clothing